Weaver Union School District is a school district that is located in Merced, California.

It is a pre-kindergarten through eight grade district

It consists of one preschool, two elementary schools (Farmdale Elementary and Pioneer Elementary), and one middle school (Weaver Middle School). It has about 2700 students.

Every year they have a kickball game between the two elementary schools

External links
Weaver Union School District

School districts in Merced County, California